Lecithocera elephantopa is a moth in the family Lecithoceridae. It was described by Edward Meyrick in 1910. It is found in southern India and Bengal.

The wingspan is 16–21 mm. The forewings are dark slaty fuscous. The stigmata are cloudy and black, the plical beneath the first discal, both often more or less elongate. The hindwings are fuscous.

References

Moths described in 1910
elephantopa